Manohar Lal Chibber (born August 1927) is an Indian Army officer and writer, known for his involvement in the Siachen conflict of 1986. He held the position of a Lieutenant General in the Indian Army and is a recipient of the Ati Vishisht Seva Medal and the Param Vishisht Seva Medal.

He was GOC-in-C of India's Northern Command, Adjutant General, and Director of Military Operations. He was a faculty at the Indian Military Academy, Dehradun and the Defence Services Staff College, Wellington.

He holds a doctoral degree in Leadership and is a recipient of the Jawaharlal Nehru Fellowship. Chibber is a director of the Management Development Institute, a centre of higher training for the Indian Administrative Service officers and corporate leaders.

He is the author of several books on military and leadership, viz. Pakistan's Criminal Folly in Kashmir, Military Leadership to Prevent Military Coup, Soldier's Role in National Integration, Leadership in the Indian Army during eighties and nineties, History of Jammu and Kashmir Light Infantry, Para Military Forces National Service For Defence, Development And National Integration Of India and Sai Baba's Mahavakya on Leadership.

He was awarded the Padma Bhushan, India's third highest civilian award, in 1986.

Bibliography

See also 
 Siachen conflict
 Kargil War

References

External links 
 

1927 births
Living people
Recipients of the Padma Bhushan in civil service
Indian Army personnel
Indian military leaders
Indian military writers
20th-century Indian social scientists
Indian business theorists
Recipients of the Ati Vishisht Seva Medal
20th-century Indian educators
Indian male writers
20th-century Indian historians
Jawaharlal Nehru Fellows
20th-century Indian military personnel
Recipients of the Param Vishisht Seva Medal
Academic staff of the Defence Services Staff College